Argyrocosma inductaria is a moth of the family Geometridae first described by Achille Guenée in 1857. It is found in Sri Lanka, India, Peninsular Malaysia and Borneo.

The species' wingspan is about 1 cm. The ground color is greenish. Its caterpillar is a light, dull green color with dorsal and lateral dark suffusions. A subdorsal white line is present. Body rugose (wrinkled) with many small conical spines. Spiracles reddish brown. Host plants are Buchanania species. Pupation occurs in a cocoon made from detritus and flower parts.

References

Moths of Asia
Moths described in 1857